was a Japanese billionaire businessman, and the founder and chairman of Sankyo, one of the three major pachinko machine makers in Japan.

According to Forbes in January 2015, he had an estimated net worth of US$4.2 billion. He died in October 2016 at the age of 91.

See also
List of Japanese by net worth

References

External links
Forbes.com: Forbes World's Richest People

1925 births
2016 deaths
20th-century Japanese businesspeople
21st-century Japanese businesspeople
Japanese billionaires
Japanese company founders